Rush is a 2019 Sri Lankan Sinhala action thriller romance film directed by Mahesh Munasinghe as his debut cinema direction and produced by Wasantha Wijendra & Rum Motion Pictures. It stars Uddika Premarathna, Saranga Disasekara and debut actress Iresha Asanki De Silva in lead roles along with Lucky Dias and Sanath Gunathilake in supportive roles. Music composed by Eranga Jayawardena and lyrics by Nilar N. Cassim and Kelum Srimal. 

Song release and press conference of the film was held at Savoy Premiere Wellawatta. It is the official sinhala remake of 1998 Tamil film Priyamudan. In 2021, the film won the award for the Most Popular Film at SLIM-Nielsen Peoples Awards.

Plot
Rashan Wijemanna who nicknamed "Rush" is a son of a wealthy businessman named Sunil Wijemanna. He grows up with a possessive attitude, and is almost considered as a psychopath by the audience. Rush goes to trip to Kandy with his best friend Rashantha and other friends. They stay at a hotel. One Day, Rashan went to a gift shop, where he breaks a gift which he likes solely as it had already been brought by someone else. He pays the owner to cover the damages but responds with a negative tagline - "If I can't get it, nobody can". On that night, He meets a young girl named Pooja in same hotel and it is love at first sight for Rashan. Pooja is injured in an accident and Rashan's best friend Rashantha Saparamadu who nicknamed "Shan" rescues her by donating blood which witnessed by Pooja's father, Prof. Madugalle. Being unconscious, Pooja does not know the face of her savior, only the name "Rashantha Saparamadu".

After she recovers, Pooja comes to Colombo to meet Rashantha Saparamadu and stays in her uncle's house. However, Rush who needs her at any cost, pretends to be Rashantha Saparamadu and makes advantage of her soft corner. He also manages to hide her from actual Rashantha. One day, Pooja and Rush go to theater to watch a movie, but he unknowingly learns that Pooja and Shan already know each other during their music project. He is angered and breaks the ice creams brought for them.

One day, Shan learns of Pooja's and Rush's affair and greets them. Pooja's father Prof. Madugalla also learns about the affair and gets happy thinking she is in love with one who saved her. Rush invites Madugalla to meet at hotel. While Pooja is away from the home for a small work, Rush meets Madugalla and admits the truth to him, shocking Madugalla. Madugalla gets a heart attack and dies in front of Rush. CID officer Radeesh begin to investigate the case with police.

One day, Shan comes to Kandy finishing music audition, which he had missed when he donated blood to Pooja. Rush arranges gest room for him but fears that he might find the truth. He goes to the hospital where Pooja was admitted and tears the certificate of admission. Shan sees this, and they go to a nearby hill station. Shan starts arguing with Rush for cheating his name. Rush apologizes and admits the truth, but Shan continues argument. He beats Rush but Shan falls from a high cliff. Having no way, Rush sacrifices his life for his friend's sake. Shocked by this incident, Rush decides to transform himself into a good gentleman and thereby leaves his behavior as that of a psychopath. Rush then sincerely starts to take care of Pooja who misses her father now.

Meanwhile, CID Radeesh come to know that the real murderer of Prof. Madugalle and Shan is Rush. Pooja also becomes aware of this while she was in jungle with Rush. Pooja gets scared and runs to jungle. Rush searches for her and is finally beaten by Pooja for killing her father. However, the police shoots Rush, and he gets unconsicinous, unable to bear the pain. Pooja bursts in tears. However, Rush admits to hospital and CID Radeesh learns that Prof. Madugalle had died from a heartattack and Rush is innocent. Shan who stays in same hospital, forgives Rush to his every mistakes. Radeesh and police apologizes from Rush while Rush's father also in there. The film ends with Rush and Pooja's wedding.

Cast
 Uddika Premarathna as Rashan Wijemanna aka 'Rush'
 Viraj Madhushan as Young Rashan Wijemanna
 Iresha Asanki de Silva as Pooja Madugalle
 Saranga Disasekara as Rashantha Saparamadu aka 'Shan'
 Isuru Lokuhettiarachchi as CID Radeesh Imbulgoda	
 Lucky Dias as Sunil Wijemanne, Rashan's father		
 Sanath Gunathilake as Prof. Madugalle
 Harsha Thennakoon as Chani
 Janith Wickramage as Diliya
 Janith Iroshan as Bunny
 Austin Samarawickrama as Mr. Saparamadu, Rashantha's father
 Anula Karunathilaka as Mrs. Saparamadu, Rashantha's mother
 Ruvi Lakmali as Rashantha's sister
 Ajith Weerasinghe as Ranil Madugalle
 Prema Pathiraja as Sujtha 
 Sujeewa Dias as Mrs. Madugalle
 Yureni Noshika as Christina
 Tekla Kumari as Sheril
 Shashi Angelina as Christina's friend
 Srimali Mallika as Janaki Wijemanna, Rashan's adopted mother
 Mike Anthony Fernando as Police OIC

Soundtrack
The film consists with four songs.

References

External links
 
 Rush on YouTube
 Rush on Facebook

2010s Sinhala-language films
2019 films